Jaime Domínguez Buj is a Spanish General of the Army who served as Chief of Staff of the Army (JEME) since July 2012 until 31 March 2017.

Early life
Jaime Domínguez Buj was born in Valencia, Spain on 15 March 1952.

Military career
Jaime Domínguez Buj joined the Spanish Army in 1970. He has held various positions at the General Department of International Affairs of the Directorate General for Defense Policy and the Technical Office of the Ministry and in the Staff of the Army. He has also been advisor to the Second Chief of Staff of the Army and Chief of Staff Operations Command.

References

Living people
1952 births
People from Valencia
Grand Crosses of the Royal and Military Order of San Hermenegild
Order of Civil Merit members
Officiers of the Légion d'honneur